The Ministry of Private Transport Services is the Sri Lankan government ministry responsible for “providing passengers with an efficient and comfortable service accompanied by modern technology; a service with an ability to fulfill passenger-demands and trusted by passengers; and through such service, to contribute maximally to the progression of other areas of economy.”

List of ministers 

The Minister of Private Transport Services is an appointment in the Cabinet of Sri Lanka.

Parties

See also 
 List of ministries of Sri Lanka

References

External links 
 Ministry of Private Transport Services
 Government of Sri Lanka

Private Transport Services
Transport in Sri Lanka